Bylgia is an extinct genus of prawns in the family Penaeidae, containing 4 species.

See also
 List of prehistoric malacostracans

References

Penaeidae